Diamond Point may refer to:
 Diamond Point, Washington, an unincorporated community in Clallam County, Washington
 Diamond Point Airport
 Diamond Point, New York, a hamlet in Warren County, New York
 Diamond Point (artist), Coast Salish artist

See also
 Diamond Point School, a historic one-room school house in Nowata County, Oklahoma